The Erie Blades name was used by two professional ice hockey teams in Erie, Pennsylvania. Both teams played their home games in the Erie County Field House. After the second Blades team folded, the void was filled by the Erie Golden Blades, a team in the Atlantic Coast Hockey League from 1982 to 1987. They changed the colors from Orange and Black to Gold and Blue with the name change.

1975–1977
The first team was a member of the North American Hockey League from 1975 to 1977. Nick Polano was the team's coach both seasons, and returned to coach the second Blades team for its first three seasons.

1978–1982
The second team was a member of the Northeastern Hockey League during the 1978–79 season, then the Eastern Hockey League from 1979 to 1981. The Blades won three consecutive league championships during these seasons. The Blades were then admitted to the American Hockey League for the 1981–82 season.

The AHL Blades continued affiliation with the Pittsburgh Penguins and Boston Bruins. Lou Angotti replaced Polano as the head coach in 1981. After a poor season on the ice, the team was relocated to Baltimore, Maryland, merging with the Baltimore Skipjacks of the Atlantic Coast Hockey League, for the 1982–83 season. Coach Angotti and sixteen players were transferred to the Skipjacks.

Season-by-season results
 Erie Blades 1975–1977 (North American Hockey League)
 Erie Blades 1978–1979 (Northeastern Hockey League)
 Erie Blades 1979–1981 (Eastern Hockey League)
 Erie Blades 1981–1982 (American Hockey League)

Regular Season

Playoffs

References

 
1975 establishments in Pennsylvania
1982 disestablishments in Pennsylvania
Boston Bruins minor league affiliates
Buffalo Sabres minor league affiliates
Defunct ice hockey teams in Pennsylvania
Denver Spurs minor league affiliates
Eastern Hockey League (1978–1981) teams
Houston Aeros minor league affiliates
Ice hockey clubs established in 1975
Ice hockey teams in Pennsylvania
Los Angeles Kings minor league affiliates
New York Islanders minor league affiliates
North American Hockey League (1973–1977) teams
Ottawa Civics minor league affiliates
Pittsburgh Penguins minor league affiliates
Quebec Nordiques minor league affiliates
Ice hockey clubs disestablished in 1982